Kim Hee-won (born January 10, 1971) is a South Korean actor. Since 2007, he has played supporting roles in films and television series, with notable titles including The Man from Nowhere (2010), Mr. Go (2013), and Misaeng: Incomplete Life (2014).

Filmography

Film

Television series

Web series

Variety show

Theater

Awards and nominations

References

External links

1971 births
Living people
21st-century South Korean male actors
South Korean male film actors
South Korean male television actors
South Korean male stage actors
South Korean male musical theatre actors
Seoul Institute of the Arts alumni
Gwangsan Kim clan